The Murrell River is a fishing river, on East Falkland in the Falkland Islands. It has a large estuary which joins with Hearnden Water and Port William, and which is not far from Stanley.

Much of the Battle of Mount Longdon was fought in and around the Murrell River, and Murrell Bridge.

It rises on Mount Challenger, with tributaries coming off Mount Kent, Harriet and Two Sisters. Its tributaries include Shanty Stream.

References

Rivers of East Falkland